"One Good Well" is a song written by Mike Reid and Kent Robbins, and recorded by American country music artist Don Williams.  It was released in April 1989 as the first single and title track from the album One Good Well.  The song reached number 4 on the Billboard Hot Country Singles & Tracks chart.

Chart performance

Year-end charts

References

1989 singles
Don Williams songs
Songs written by Mike Reid (singer)
Songs written by Kent Robbins
Song recordings produced by Garth Fundis
RCA Records singles
1989 songs